DPIR may refer to:
 Detașamentul de Poliție pentru Intervenție Rapidă, the Rapid Intervention Police Squad in Romania
 the Department of Primary Industry and Resources administered by the Minister for Primary Industry and Resources (Northern Territory), Australia
 the Death Penalty India Report on Capital punishment in India
Department of Politics and International Relations, University of Oxford, academic department in UK